Ponting Bridges is a Slovenian studio for structural engineering, focusing mainly on bridge structures, with headquarters in Maribor. The practice is led by a duo of its founders, dr. Viktor Markelj and Marjan Pipenbaher, and has constructed many high-profile bridges. 
These include Ada Bridge in Belgrade (2012), Pelješac Bridge (ongoing), drawbridge in Gdansk (2017), Nissibi Euphrates Bridge in Turkey (2015), Puch Bridge in Ptuj (2007) and Črni Kal Viaduct in Slovenia (2004).

History

The studio was established by dr. Viktor Markelj and Marjan Pipenbaher as Ponting inženirski biro in 1990, after both left structural engineering company Gradis.

Major projects
Major projects, by year of completion and ordered by type, are:

Bridges
 Carinthian bridge, Maribor, Slovenia (1996)
 Bridge over Mura River, highway Vučja vas - Beltinci, Slovenia (2003)
 Črni Kal Viaduct, Slovenia (2004)
 Viaduct Bivje, Slovenia (2004)
 Millennium Bridge, Podgorica, Montenegro (2006)
 Puch Bridge, Ptuj, Slovenia (2007) 
 Viaduct Bonifika, Koper, Slovenia (2007)
 Viaduct Šumljak, highway Razdrto - Selo, Slovenia (2009)
 Viaduct Dobruša, Slovenia (2010)
 Viaduct Lešnica North / South, Slovenia (2007/2011)
 Ada Bridge, Belgrade, Serbia (2012)
 Peračica viaducts, Slovenia (2012)
 Giborim bridge, Haifa, Israel (2012)
 Nissibi Euphrates Bridge, highway Adiyaman - Diyarbakir, Turkey (2015) 
 High speed railway bridge no. 10, HSR Tel Aviv - Jerusalem, Israel (2017)
 NAR Viaducts, Belgrade, Serbia (2018)

Over- and underpasses
 Arch overpass 4-3 in Kozina, Slovenia (1997)
 Underpass in Celje, Slovenia (2004)
 Overpass 4-6 in Slivnica, Slovenia (2008)
 Viaduct/overpass Grobelno, Slovenia (2015)

Pedestrian and cyclist bridges
 Footbridge in Ptuj, Slovenia (1997)
 Footbridge over Soča, Bovec, Slovenia (2007)
 Studenci footbridge, Maribor, Slovenia (2007)
 Marinič footbridge, Škocjan Caves Park, Slovenia (2010)
 Ribja brv, Ljubljana, Slovenia (2014)
 Pedestrian and cyclist drawbridge to Ołowianka Island, Gdansk, Poland (2017)
 Langur Way Canopy Walk, Penang Hill, Malaysia (2018)
 Pedestrian and cycle bridge in Tremerje, Laško, Slovenia (2019)

Tunnels and galleries
 Tunnel Malečnik, Maribor, Slovenia (2009)
 Arcade gallery Meljski hrib, Maribor, Slovenia (2012)

Current
 Pelješac Bridge, Croatia (under construction)
 Kömürhan Bridge, Turkey (under construction)
 Ada Huja Bridge, Belgrade, Serbia (preliminary design)
 Highway bridge and parallel pedestrian bridge over Krka river, Slovenia (construction completed, finishing works)
 Railway viaduct Pesnica, Slovenia (preliminary design)

Selected works

Awards 
 2019 Jožef Mrak Award for Pelješac Bridge
 2019 Honorary City Certificate of Slovenska Bistrica to Dr. Viktor Markelj and Marjan Pipenbaher
 2019 Polish Minister of Investment and Development Award  to Footbridge to Ołowianka Island in Gdansk
 2018 City of Gdansk Award to Footbridge to Ołowianka Island in Gdansk
 2015 SCE Award to Viaduct Grobelno
 2012 WEF Award to Ada Bridge Belgrade
 2012 CES AWARD to Ada Bridge Belgrade 
 2012 AAB Award  to Ada Bridge Belgrade 
 2011 Footbridge Award to Marinic Bridge
 2009 City seal of Maribor to Studenci Footbridge Maribor
 2009 Award CSS of CCIS to Studenci Footbridge Maribor
 2008 Footbridge Award to Studenci Footbridge Maribor
 2007 SCE Award to Puch Bridge over Drava in Ptuj
 2004 SCE Award to Bridge over Mura River
 2004 UM Award 2004: Golden recognition award to Mr. Marjan Pipenbaher and Mr. Viktor Markelj
 1999 Award CSS of CCIS to Footbridge in Ptuj

References

External links 
 Ponting Bridges Website
 Researchgate Website, Viktor Markelj's publications

Bridge engineers
Slovenian architects
Companies based in Maribor
1990 establishments in Slovenia